The 1992 Bausch & Lomb Championships was a women's tennis tournament played on outdoor clay courts at the Amelia Island Plantation on Amelia Island, Florida in the United States that was part of Tier II of the 1992 WTA Tour. It was the 13th edition of the tournament and was held from April 6 through April 12, 1992. Gabriela Sabatini won the singles title.

Finals

Singles
 Gabriela Sabatini defeated  Steffi Graf 6–2, 1–6, 6–3
 It was Sabatini's 4th title of the year and the 24th of her career.

Doubles
 Arantxa Sánchez Vicario /  Natasha Zvereva defeated  Zina Garrison-Jackson /  Jana Novotná 6–1, 6–0
 It was Sánchez Vicario's 6th title of the year and the 14th of her career. It was Zvereva's 3rd title of the year and the 22nd of her career.

External links
 ITF tournament edition details

Bausch and Lomb Championships
Amelia Island Championships
Bausch & Lomb Championships
Bausch & Lomb Championships
Bausch & Lomb Championships